Élincourt-Sainte-Marguerite is a commune in the Oise department in northern France.

Élincourt-Sainte-Marguerite is situated between Paris and Lille in the region of Hauts-de-France, 100 km from Paris, 80 km from Amiens, and 145 km from Lille.

Population
The residents of the commune are called Élincourtois.

Personalities
Élincourt-Sainte-Marguerite was the birthplace of:
Abel Lefranc (1863-1952), historian of French literature, expert on Rabelais.

See also
Communes of the Oise department

References

Communes of Oise